Thomas Chisholm Anstey (1816 – 12 August 1873) was an English lawyer and one of the first Catholic parliamentarians in the nineteenth century. He served as Attorney General of Hong Kong for 4 years.  He also wrote pamphlets on legal and political topics, particularly those relevant to Roman Catholics.

Early life

He was the second son of Thomas Anstey (1777–1851) and his wife Mary Turnbull, born in Kentish Town, London. In 1823, his father, a lawyer who had gone into commerce, moved to Tasmania, and he followed in 1827 with his elder brother George Alexander (1814–1895). In his early education he studied Hebrew with the minister James Garrett.

Anstey returned to England, intending to take up law, and was educated at school in Wellington, Somerset and at University College London. He came under the influence of the Tractarians, and also entered the Middle Temple, being called to the bar in 1839. He had become a Catholic convert, married that year, and moved with his wife to Hobart, Tasmania. He became a Catholic leader there, and achieved prominence for a court appearance (R. v. Espie, 1840). But he lost a position as commissioner of insolvent estates after a few months.

Returning to England, Anstey took an appointment as Professor of Law and Jurisprudence at Prior Park College, Bath. By 1846 he had turned his attention to politics, and resigned.

Political career

Anstey favoured the repeal of the Union both with Ireland and Scotland. He was a Liberal in English politics, but Walker classifies him as an Irish Confederate candidate when he was elected Member of Parliament for the Irish constituency of Youghal in 1847. He was not renominated at Youghal in 1852, but contested Bedford in the general election of that year.

An opponent of Lord Palmerston, Anstey often worked with David Urquhart as ally in foreign policy issues. On first entering politics in 1846, he aligned with the more radical followers of Daniel O'Connell, who died in 1847, and supported William Smith O'Brien.

Legal career
On Anstey's return to England, he joined the Northern Circuit before moving to practice at the Chancery Bar. After he dropped out of Parliament, in 1855, he was appointed Attorney General of Hong Kong and served in that capacity until 1859. His attempts to enforce building regulations on Chinese merchants led in 1858 to a strike, retrospectively named the "Anstey Riots".

Anstey left Hong Kong in 1859, having fallen out with the Governor Sir John Bowring.   He went to Bombay (now Mumbai) where at times he acted Judge of the High Court of Bombay in 1865. He came back to England in 1866 and in a tract entitled A Plea for the Unrepresented for the Restitution of the Franchise advocated universal suffrage as a panacea for the ills resulting from class legislation. In 1867 he published an attack on Benjamin Disraeli's Reform Act of that year.

In 1868 Anstey returned to Bombay and resumed his practice as a barrister.

Anstey died in Bombay on 17 August 1873, ending a life hampered by quarrels. He was buried at Sewri.

Works

Anstey's publications included:

 British Catholics and the New Parliament (1841),
 Guide to the Laws of England affecting Roman Catholics (1842)
 Guide to the History of the Laws and Constitution of England in Six Lectures
 Crime and Government at Hong Kong (1859)

He was a contributor in its early years to the Dublin Review.

Family
In 1839, Anstey married Harriet, daughter of Jarrard Edward Strickland of Loughlinn, County Roscommon, Ireland. She was one of a family of six sons, including Edward Strickland, and four daughters.

References

Further reading

External links

 

Attribution

1816 births
1873 deaths
English Roman Catholics
Members of the Parliament of the United Kingdom for County Cork constituencies (1801–1922)
UK MPs 1847–1852
Members of the Middle Temple
Attorneys General of Hong Kong